Stena Spirit is a large cruiseferry owned by Stena Line. She entered service in 1988 as Stena Scandinavica and after a major refit in Gothenburg is now in service between Karlskrona and Gdynia.

History
Stena Scandinavica was the second of four ferries ordered in 1980 by Stena Line for Scandinavian routes. She was launched in 1983 as Stena Germanica, but problems at the construction yard delayed her completion until 1988 when she entered service on the Gothenburg – Kiel route, joining her sister Stena Germanica (now ). The remaining two hulls were planned to be Stena Polonica (completed for ANEK Lines as El Venizelos) and Stena Baltica (now ; lengthened by over 50 m, but never completed).

In April 2011 Stena Scandinavia was replaced on the Kiel – Gothenburg route by a new . Following a major refit she was renamed Stena Spirit and entered service between Karlskrona and Gdynia.

Gdynia Accident, Poland

On 17 May 2012 at 8:45am, the Stena Spirit was departing from Gdynia Ferry Terminal en route to Karlskrona, Sweden when she became involved in an accident at the Baltic Container Terminal. The bow (ship) of the cruiseferry struck one of the Gantry cranes causing it to catastrophically collapse onto the quay below as she was manoeuvring. Three employees of the container terminal were injured, all requiring hospital treatment. Two of the Three staff members are said to be in a serious condition. None of the passengers or crew on board the Stena Spirit were injured.

A full investigation is being carried out to determine and establish the cause of the accident.

References

External links

Ferries of Germany
Ferries of Sweden
1983 ships
Ships of the Stena Line